Russell Earl Holmes is an American politician who serves as a Democratic member of the Massachusetts House of Representatives. First elected in November 2010, he represents the Sixth Suffolk District, which includes the Boston neighborhoods of Dorchester, Hyde Park, Jamaica Plain, Mattapan and Roslindale.

Massachusetts House of Representatives 
Holmes was first elected to the Massachusetts House of Representatives in November 2010, and assumed office in January 2011.

Holmes served as treasurer for the 187th General Court freshman class and was formerly a member of the Judiciary Committee. Holmes was one of a handful of legislators nationally selected to participate in the Emerging Leaders program at University of Virginia Darden School of Business. He was also member of the Electronic Benefit Transfer Card Commission. He served as the Chair of the Black and Latino Caucus of Massachusetts. Holmes was a member of Public Housing Sustainability and Reform Advisory Committee.

He serves as vice chairman of the Joint Committee on Public Housing, and serves as a member on the Joint Committee on Financial Services, the Joint Committee on Election Laws, and the Joint Committee on Ways and Means.

In early 2023, Holmes cosponsored a bill to allow Massachusetts prisoners to earn time off from their sentences by immediately forfeiting some of their vital organs and/or bone marrow to the state.

Images

See also
 2019–2020 Massachusetts legislature
 2021–2022 Massachusetts legislature

References

External links 
 State House Website
 Campaign Website

Living people
Democratic Party members of the Massachusetts House of Representatives
1969 births
Northeastern University alumni
Boston University College of Engineering alumni
21st-century American politicians
People from Mound Bayou, Mississippi
People from Mattapan
Hyde Park High School (Massachusetts) alumni
African-American state legislators in Massachusetts
21st-century African-American politicians
20th-century African-American people